A list of parks in Madrid, Spain, sorted by district, is presented as follows:

Arganzuela 
 ; 45.8 ha.
 Parque Madrid Río (also in Centro, Carabanchel, Usera, Latina, Moncloa-Aravaca and Villa de Vallecas); 121.1 ha.

Barajas 
 Parque del Capricho; 17.6 ha.
 Parque Juan Carlos I; 210.38 ha.

Centro 
 Campo del Moro; 24.51 ha.
 Parque Madrid Río (also in Arganzuela, Carabanchel, Usera, Latina, Moncloa-Aravaca and Villa de Vallecas); 121.1 ha.

Carabanchel 
 Parque de las Cruces (also in Latina); 37 ha.
 Parque Emperatriz María de Austria (aka Parque Sur); 42 ha.

Centro 
 Parque Madrid Río (also in Arganzuela, Centro, Usera, Latina, Moncloa-Aravaca and Villa de Vallecas); 121.1 ha.
 ; 27 ha.

Chamartín 
 , 4.79 ha.

Fuencarral-El Pardo 
 ; 19,5 ha.

Hortaleza 
 ; 470 ha.

Latina 
 ; 16 ha.
 Parque del Cerro Almodóvar; 18.5 ha.
 Parque de las Cruces (also in Carabanchel); 37 ha.
 Parque de la Cuña Verde de Latina; 52.41 ha.
 Parque Madrid Río (also in Arganzuela, Carabanchel, Centro, Usera, Moncloa-Aravaca and Villa de Vallecas); 121.1 ha.

Moncloa-Aravaca 
 Casa de Campo; 1,508.97 ha.
 ; 65.55 ha.
 ; 12.71 ha.
 Parque Madrid Río (also in Arganzuela, Carabanchel, Centro, Usera, Latina and Villa de Vallecas); 121.1 ha.
 Parque del Oeste; 61.41 ha.

Puente de Vallecas 
 Parque Lineal del Manzanares (also in Usera); 97.3 ha in the municipality of Madrid.
 Parque Lineal de Palomeras; 38.4 ha.
 ; 17 ha.

Retiro 
 El Retiro; 120.67 ha.
 Jardín Botánico; 8.09 ha.
 Parque de Roma; 11.54 ha.

Salamanca 
 ; 8.12 ha.

San Blas-Canillejas 
 ; 12.9 ha.
 Pinar de la Elipa; 15.19 ha.

Tetuán 
 Parque Agustín Rodríguez Sahagún; 13,84 ha.
 Parque de la Ventilla; 8.36 ha.

Usera 
 Parque Lineal del Manzanares (also in Puente de Vallecas); 97.3 ha in the municipality of Madrid.
 Parque Madrid Río (also in Arganzuela, Carabanchel, Centro, Latina, Moncloa-Aravaca and Villa de Vallecas); 121.1 ha.
 ; 42.4 ha.

Villa de Vallecas 
 ; 88.84 ha.
 Parque Forestal M-40; 11.6 ha.
 Parque Madrid Río (also in Arganzuela, Carabanchel, Centro, Usera, Latina and Moncloa-Aravaca); 121.1 ha.
 Parque Santa Eugenia; 13.9 ha.

Villaverde 
 Parque de Plata y Castañar; 23.3 ha.

References 
Citations

Bibliography